Dragomir Zagorsky was a Bulgarian author and philatelist, described by Ivan Metchev as the "greatest expert and collector of Bulgaria of all time".

He wrote widely on the postage stamps and postal history of Bulgaria and Eastern Roumelia. His book, The Jews of Bulgaria: A Collection of Bulgarian Judaica Jüdische (c. 1989), described, through the correspondence of Jewish merchants, the development of postal communications in Bulgaria between independence in 1878 and the Second World War.

Selected publications
 Ostrumelien 1878 - 1885 Postgeschichte und postalische Ausgaben (1984)
 Bulgarien : Postgeschichte und postalische Ausgaben einschliesslich einer detaillierten Studie der Poststempel 1878 - 1935 (1986)
 First Bulgarian Single-Circle Stamps in Historical Rumelia Following Unification, Dragomir Zagorsky, La Mesa CA, 1987.
 A History of Bulgarian Philatelic Rarities, Dragomir Zagorsky, La Mesa CA, 1989.
 "First Issue of Bulgaria", Trumpter, No. 18 (Winter 1989), pp. 1–2. 
 The Jews of Bulgaria: A Collection of Bulgarian Judaica Jüdische (c. 1989)
 "Bulgarian forgery found", Linn's Stamp News, 29 March 1993, p. 10.

References

External links 

https://stampforgeries.com/forged-stamps-of-bulgaria/

Bulgarian philatelists
Philately of Bulgaria
Bulgarian emigrants to the United States
Year of birth missing
Year of death missing
Bulgarian writers
Philatelic authors